Life Force is a British science fiction children's television series broadcast in 2000 on ITV. Produced by Childsplay Productions for CITV, the series was devised, written, directed, and produced by Peter Tabern, alongside writers Rik Carmichael, John Hay, and Greg McQueen, and directors Lorne Magory and Justin Chadwick. Set in the post-apocalyptic future of 2025, in which global warming has drowned vast swathes of the planet and left its remains in chaos, four children, two possessing telepathic and telekinetic powers, are hunted by an oppressive government.

Life Force ran for one 13-episode season, and was also shown in Australia. Met with viewer complaints, disjointed scheduling, and poor ratings on its original UK broadcast, it has not been commercially released or repeated since.

Overview
In the year 2025, global warming has caused severe weather conditions, melting the polar ice caps and consequently flooding Earth. Navigated by a network of boats, the former United Kingdom is reduced to a mere archipelago, with the Cumbrian Mountains renamed "Black Combe Island", and the remaining oppressive factions of its federal government deploys a task force known as "The Commission". The agency outlaws migrant 'climeys' (climate refugees), 'senders' (new genetically engineered humans possessing telepathic and telekinetic powers, evidenced by glowing yellow eyes), and the practise of all science, cruelly tracking the activities of remaining civilians. Their objective is to blame and take away the scientists who had tried to prevent the drowning of the planet from occurring, as well as to harvest 'senders'. 

In the aftermath of the climate disaster, young siblings Greg and Karen Webber are left to fend for themselves on Black Combe Island. Their parents, Amy and Richard, are arrested and imprisoned by The Commission following the discovery of their work teaching science at the island's school in the hopes of raising a new generation of physicists, and involvement in Greenwatch, an underground environmental pressure collective composed of the remaining ecologic scientists across the world, communicating through intermittently available satellite links. 

Greg and Karen team up and attempt to continue their efforts alongside Mai-Li Cheung and Ash Karnak, two particularly able 'sender' children with whom their parents had been teaching, and Goodman, an old Greenwatch campaigner and family friend acting as their guardian. Kurt Glemser, a malevolent 'sender' agent working for The Commission, plots to pursue the children whilst they investigate and try to solve issues caused by the disaster; helping and protecting life affected by those who have resorted to crime, cults, and abuse in the chaos of the new climate.

Production and broadcast
Life Force was in production for more than three years during the latter part of the 1990s. Its budget was reportedly around $3.8 million. The series was made for ITV by independent production company Childsplay Productions, whose previous works had included 1993's Eye of the Storm. Similar to Eye of the Storm, it was devised by producer Peter Tabern as an environmentally-conscious children's drama series; however, Life Force would portray the aftermath of an ecological disaster with a science fiction slant and episodic format, instead of more fantasy-led elements making the issue an overarching threat throughout the former serial.

All but two weeks of filming for Life Force took place between March and August 1999 in Horwich, Bolton. The area was chosen for its derelict atmosphere and factory, with numerous Grade II-listed stone mills surrounding it; a search was initially made in London, but according to Tabern, none of the locations could convey the intended on-screen geography. Employees of the Arcon Engineering factory, as well as their relatives, were subsequently offered smaller roles and used as extras in crowds. During a period in which water levels fell, sequences being filmed at Bolton reservoirs were instead briefly made at Loch Lomond, Scotland.

Whilst in production, Life Force was first previewed and illustrated for a two page report in the September 1999 edition of Televisiual magazine. Further advance coverage was given by TV Zone. In the weeks leading up to its premiere, the series was promoted as part of new weekday schedules for the start of 2000. Lead actors Sarah Hollis and Pablo Duarte additionally appeared to be interviewed as studio guests during in-vision presentation links for CITV in December 1999.

Beginning on January 10 2000, Life Force was first broadcast during Monday afternoons at 4:35pm, within the CITV children's programming strand on ITV1 in the United Kingdom. These airings were pulled after the fourth episode, and from February 13 onward the remainder of the series was only shown in a 9:50am Sunday morning slot where previous editions had been repeated. Episodes were also reportedly given repeat airings during Tuesday afternoons on ITV2.

In Australia, Life Force was acquired by ABC for ABC Kids. ITEL, at that time newly under United News & Media, was the programme's international distributor.

Cast and characters
From the programme's official website and BFI entries:

Episodes

Critical response and legacy
The first four airings of Life Force in its original Monday afternoon CITV timeslot were said to receive numerous viewer complaints and calls for it to be removed, with concerns over what was perceived as graphic imagery for audiences of the programming strand. A scene in which a child impaled a pencil through their hand is alleged to have caused particular controversy. Following a near-two week period in which no new episodes were shown, the remainder of the series was moved to instead broadcast on Sunday mornings. Previous editions had been repeated there in an attempt to create word of mouth during the preceding weeks.

In part due to its shift to mornings, Life Force underperformed in the schedules.  With its afternoon slot replaced by Sabrina The Teenage Witch, producer Peter Tabern publicly criticized ITV, blaming the move on "the timidness of broadcasters" and accusing them of not making it clear to viewers. Tabern also claimed then-controller of ITV children's and youth programming Nigel Pickard had reneged on an unwritten mutual agreement over its scheduling, despite him being "a fan" of the show, and initially intending it to be one of his commissions during 2000 to appeal towards older children alongside the final series of Children's Ward.

A second series of Life Force was subsequently never ordered for CITV, leaving the final episode's open-ended conclusion and several plot aspects unresolved. Since its original broadcasts in the UK and Australia, the existing episodes have not been commercially released. Though an obscure, scarcely-seen series and a subject of viewer complaints at the time, the programme has been critically acclaimed in contemporary reviews, given positive retrospective assessments, and cited as a 'quality' example in writing about British television through the decades, including in a children's sci-fi/fantasy-focused piece as part of Screenonline, and The Hill and Beyond, an encyclopaedic overview of the country's children's drama output, both by Doctor Who Magazine contributor Alistair McGown for the BFI.

References

External links

BFI Collections page

2000 British television series debuts
2000 British television series endings
British science fiction television shows
ITV children's television shows
English-language television shows